High on Jackson Hill is the fourth studio album by Immaculate Machine, released April 28, 2009 on Mint Records.

Track listing

Personnel
Brooke Gallupe – vocals, guitar, bass, organ, percussion 
Kathryn Calder – vocals, keyboards
Luke Kozlowski – vocals, background vocals
Marek Tyler - drums, percussions
Caitlin Gallupe – artwork, background vocals
Leslie Rewega – guitar ("Primary Colours"), background vocals, percussion

References

2009 albums
Immaculate Machine albums